Abdulwahid A. Bidin (7 April 1925 – 2 February 1999) was a Filipino lawyer who served as Associate Justice of the Supreme Court of the Philippines. Appointed by President Corazon Aquino in 1987, he was the first Filipino Muslim named to the country's Supreme Court.

Early life
Born in Tawi-Tawi, Bidin finished his high school education in Sulu. He fought with the resistance movement against the Japanese Occupation during World War II, and after pursued attended the University of the Philippines as a government scholar, and eventually earned his law degree from the university's College of Law.

Bidin returned to Sulu and spent the next few years in private practise. From 1956 to 1959, he was an elected member of the Sulu Provincial Board.

Judicial career
Bidin first entered the judiciary in 1968, when he was appointed trial judge in Zamboanga City. He was cited by the Integrated Bar of the Philippines as the Most Outstanding Trial Court Judge for 1979.

In 1983, Bidin was appointed to the Intermediate Appellate Court (now known as the Court of Appeals). He was an Associate Justice there until he was elevated to the Supreme Court on 12 January 1987. Bidin served in the Supreme Court for eight years until he reached the mandatory retirement age of 70 in April 1995.

Death
Bidin died four years after his retirement from the Court on 2 February 1999 at age 73.

References

1925 births
1999 deaths
Associate Justices of the Supreme Court of the Philippines
Filipino Muslims
Paramilitary Filipinos
People from Tawi-Tawi
University of the Philippines alumni
20th-century Filipino lawyers